Mohamed Naâmani (born 21 May 1990) is an Algerian professional footballer who currently plays as a defender with MC Oran.

Professional career
Naâmani began his career with various Algerian clubs before moving to Al-Fateh SC on 25 June 2018. Naâmani made his professional debut with Al-Fateh in a 0-0 Saudi Professional League tie with Al-Qadsiah FC on 31 August 2018.

International career
Naâmani made his senior debut with the Algeria national football team in a friendly 2-0 loss to Saudi Arabia on 9 May 2018.

References

External links
 
 
 

1990 births
Living people
Footballers from Algiers
Algerian footballers
Algeria international footballers
Association football defenders
Al-Fateh SC players
CR Belouizdad players
ASO Chlef players
USM Blida players
MC Oran players
Saudi Professional League players
Algerian Ligue Professionnelle 1 players
Algerian Ligue 2 players
Algerian expatriate footballers
Algerian expatriate sportspeople in Saudi Arabia
Expatriate footballers in Saudi Arabia
21st-century Algerian people